Club Athlétique Brive Corrèze Limousin, also referred to as CA Brive, Brive or CAB, is a French professional rugby union club based in Brive-la-Gaillarde, in the Corrèze department. They compete in the first-tier Top 14 competition. 

Brive is a historical member of French rugby union, being one of the clubs that spent the most seasons in the top French domestic competition. "Les Coujous" also won the Heineken Cup in 1997, defeating Leicester Tigers in the final in a 28-9 win. 

Many great players, both French and foreign, played for the club currently headed by Simon Gillham, and the youth academy has a good reputation. Brive players who also on to play for France include: Amédée Domenech, nicknamed "Le Duc" ("The Duke") who played there in the 1950s and 60s, and gave his name to the stadium after his death in 2003; prolific flanker Olivier Magne, fly-halves Christophe Lamaison and Alain Penaud, number-eight Jean-Luc Joinel and hooker Michel Yachvili, the father of Dimitri Yachvili, also wore the black and white jersey.

Their home ground is the 14,759-capacity Stade Amédée-Domenech and the club colours are black and white.

History 
The club was created on 15 March 1910 established on 12 October 1912. Before the Second World War, Brive changed from rugby union to rugby league but returned to union after the war.

It played regularly in the First Division, and established itself as the stronghold of rugby in Limousin but for many years its only title was a Second Division trophy won in 1957. Brive did not make it to the final of the First Division championship until 1965. On 23 May that year they met SU Agen at Stade de Gerland in Lyon only to lose 15–8. Brive next made it to the final in the 1972 season, where they faced AS Béziers on 21 May in Lyon again, and again the Black and White came out the losers, as Béziers won their second consecutive title (9–0). Brive met AS Béziers in the final again three season later, in 1975. By then, Béziers had become the unbeatable team of the decade, and they won their fifth title, this time by just one point (13–12), at Parc des Princes in Paris.

Brive experienced a resurgence in the middle of the 1990s, first in 1996, when they made their first finals appearance since the mid-1970s in Paris. Brive however went down 20–13 to Stade Toulousain. It was their fourth losing final. Only one club have lost more finals without winning one than them (US Dax, on five). That year however, they won the Challenge Yves du Manoir, defeating Pau 12–6. The following season, they made it to the final of the Heineken Cup where they faced the Leicester Tigers from England at Cardiff Arms Park. Brive finally won a final, defeating the Tigers 28–9. They are the only club to win the European Cup without ever winning their domestic championship.

On 22 February 1997, Brive, as European champions, were pitted against Auckland Blues who had recently won the Super 12. The French team were no competition to an extra powerful Kiwi side which won easily 47–11. In 1998 Brive again reached the final of the Heineken Cup, this time against Bath. They came close to capturing back-to-back titles, losing by just one point, 19–18 at Parc Lescure in Bordeaux.

Since then, however, the club has been in dire straits, as it was subjected to a punitive relegation to the second division in 2000 due to bad financial management. They bounced back two years later but have struggled ever since in the lower echelons of the league table, except in 2004 when they managed to qualify for the playoffs. In 2005, Brive went to the semi-finals of European Challenge Cup, but they lost to Pau. In 2009, after taking the sixth place of the Championship, the Black and White could participate in the Heineken Cup, but the competition was difficult for them, against the Europeans champions Leinster, Llanelli Scarlets and London Irish.

After difficulties and a relegation to the second division in 2012, Brive returned to the Top 14 the following year, after defeating Pau.

Honours
 Heineken Cup
 Champions (1): 1996–97
 Runners-up (1): 1997–98

 French Rugby Union Championship
 Runners-up (4): 1964–65, 1971–72, 1974–75, 1995–96

 French Second Division
 Champions (1): 1956–57
 Runners-up (2): 2012–13, 2018–19

 Promotion play-offs Final/Top 14 Access Match
 Champions (2): 2012–13, 2018–19

 Challenge Yves du Manoir:
 Champions (1): 1996
 Runners-up (2): 1963, 1974

 Coupe de France:
 Runners-up (1): 2000

Finals results

Heineken Cup

French Rugby Union Championship

Challenge Yves du Manoir

Coupe de France

Current standings

Current squad

The Brive squad for the 2022–23 season:

Espoirs squad

Notable former players
The following are players who have represented their country, players who have won a title with the club, players who have played a sufficient number of games to go down in the club history or players who came from the academy and have made a significant career in another team:

 
 Horacio Agulla
 Lisandro Arbizu
 Christian Martin
 Agustin Figuerola
 Pablo Henn
 Alex Moreno
 Eduardo Simone
 Tim Donnelly
 Peter FitzSimons
 Mark Giacheri
 Poutasi Luafutu
 Alfie Mafi
 Chris Tuatara-Morrison
 John Welborn
 Scott Franklin
 John Tait
 Phil Christophers
 Ben Cohen
 Riki Flutey
 Shane Geraghty
 Andy Goode
 Ben Johnston
 Jamie Noon
 Shaun Perry
 Steve Thompson
 Christian Short
 Filimone Bolavucu
 Kitione Kamikamica
 Sisa Koyamaibole
 Norman Ligairi
 Tabai Matson
 Benito Masilevu
 Peniami Narisia
 Dominiko Waqaniburotu
 Demba Bamba
 Roger Bastié
 Mathieu Bélie
 Nicolas Bézy
 Alexandre Bias
 Pascal Bomati
 Sébastien Bonetti
 Terry Bouhraoua
 Russlan Boukerou
 Jacques Boussuge
 Hugues Briatte
 Julien Brugnaut
 Romain Cabannes
 Benoît Cabello
 Julien Caminati
 Pierre Capdevielle
 Georges Carabignac
 Philippe Carbonneau
 Alain Carminati
 Sébastien Carrat
 Florian Cazenave
 Pierre Chadebech
 Damien Chouly
 Antonie Claassen
 Valentin Courrent
 Benjamin Dambielle
 Thierry Devergie
 Amédée Domenech
 Yves Donguy
 Thibault Dubarry
 Fabrice Estebanez
 Roger Fite
 Mickaël Forest
 Gaëtan Germain
 Jérôme Guisset
 Dominique Harize
 Cédric Heymans
 Teddy Iribaren
 Nicolas Jeanjean
 Jean-Luc Joinel
 Virgile Lacombe
 Damien Lagrange
 Julien Laharrague
 Christophe Lamaison
 Benjamin Lapeyre
 Julien Le Devedec
 Olivier Magne
 Arnaud Mela
 Arnaud Mignardi
 Rodolphe Modin
 Vincent Moscato
 Alexis Palisson
 Élie Pebeyre
 Michel Pebeyre
 Alexandre Péclier
 Alain Penaud
 Maxime Petitjean
 Lucas Pointud
 Jefferson Poirot
 Fabien Sanconnie
 Thomas Sanchou
 Patrick Sébastien
 Atila Septar
 Farid Sid
 Scott Spedding
 Laurent Travers
 Sébastien Vahaamahina
 Ludovic Valbon
 Loïc Van Der Linden
 David Venditti
 Elvis Vermeulen
 Sébastien Viars
 Pierre Villepreux
 Dimitri Yachvili
 Michel Yachvili
 Tedo Abzhandadze
 Karlen Asieshvili
 Soso Bekoshvili
 Otar Giorgadze
 Giorgi Jgenti
 Vasil Kakovin
 David Khinchagishvili
 Mamuka Magrakvelidze
 Irakli Natriashvili
 Anton Peikrishvili
 Goderdzi Shvelidze
 Valerio Bernabò
 Luciano Orquera
 Damian Browne
 Tjiuee Uanivi
 Brad Mika
 Tamato Leupolu
 Viliame Waqaseduadua
 Grzegorz Kacala
 Petru Bălan
 Alexandru Manta
 Sorin Socol
 Petrişor Toderasc
 Pat Barnard
 Kevin Buys
 So'otala Fa'aso'o
 Terry Fanolua
 Na'ama Leleimalefaga
 Simon Lemalu
 Mike Blair
 Tom Smith
 Gregor Townsend
 Alex Dunbar
 Suka Hufanga
 Kevin Dalzell
 Barry Davies
 Liam Davies
 Kieran Murphy
 Alix Popham

See also
 List of rugby union clubs in France
 Rugby union in France

References

External links
  CA Brive Official website
 Unofficial fan's site
 CA Brive profile on Rugby15

 
Brive
Rugby clubs established in 1910
1910 establishments in France
Brive
Sport in Corrèze